SDMS may refer to:
 Sanatan Dharma Maha Sabha, Hindu organisation in Trinidad and Tobago
 Scientific data management system
 Society of Diagnostic Medical Sonography
 Silas Deane Middle School
 S.D.Ms., an abbreviation used for the United States District Court for the Southern District of Mississippi